357th may refer to:

357th Air & Missile Defense Detachment, brigade level Air Defense unit of the United States Army
357th Airlift Squadron (357 AS), part of the 908th Airlift Wing at Maxwell Air Force Base, Alabama
357th Fighter Group, air combat unit of the United States Army Air Forces during the Second World War
357th Fighter Squadron (357 FS), part of the 355th Fighter Wing at Davis-Monthan Air Force Base, Arizona

See also
357 (number)
357, the year 357 (CCCLVII) of the Julian calendar
357 BC